Dexithea humeralis is a species of beetle in the family Cerambycidae. It was described by Chemsak and Noguera in 2001.

References

Clytini
Beetles described in 2001